Bogusław Hajdas (born 21 July 1939) is a Polish football player and coach.

Career

Playing career
Bogusław Hajdas played for Warta Zawiercie, Lotnik Warszawa and AZS-AWF Warszawa.

Coaching career
Bogusław Hajdas managed Gwardia Warszawa, Pogoń Szczecin, KuPS, Poland U-21, Wisła Kraków, VPS, Hutnik Kraków and Raków Częstochowa.

References

1939 births
Living people
Polish footballers
Polish football managers
Gwardia Warsaw managers
Pogoń Szczecin managers
Wisła Kraków managers
Hutnik Nowa Huta managers
Raków Częstochowa managers
Vaasan Palloseura managers
Kuopion Palloseura managers
Footballers from Kraków
Association football defenders
Polish expatriate football managers